Alexander "Alex" Lewington (born 20 September 1991 in Nottingham, England) is a rugby union player who plays for Saracens in the Gallagher Premiership as a winger.

Lewington's career started with Leicester Tigers, making appearances in the LV= Cup. Lewington then signed for London Irish for the 2013-14 season. Lewington scored 10 tries in 10 games on his return from injury in the 2016-17 season before scoring two tries in the Championship play-off final. In January 2018, it was announced that Lewington would join Saracens for the 2018-19 season. He has since re-signed with the club until at least the end of 2021–22 season.

Lewington has played internationally for England Saxons and has expressed interest in making the primary England international squad. Hoping good performances at Sarries should help his cause. He hit the ground running at Saracens, in 2018, scoring 45 points in all competitions by the end of November 2018. 

Currently Lewington is a regular player for Cup and league matches for Saracens on the wing.

References

External links
Saracens profile
England Rugby profile

1991 births
Living people
English rugby union players
London Irish players
Rugby union wings
Leicester Tigers players
Nottingham R.F.C. players
Rugby union players from Nottingham
Saracens F.C. players